Nothofagus womersleyi is a species of plant in the family Nothofagaceae. It is endemic to West Papua (Indonesia). It was proposed to be renamed  Trisyngyne womersleyi  in 2013. 
It is a Critically Endangered species threatened by habitat loss.

References

Nothofagaceae
Endemic flora of Western New Guinea
Endangered plants
Taxonomy articles created by Polbot